Saccifolium is a monotypic genus of flowering plants belonging to the family Gentianaceae. The only species is Saccifolium bandeirae.

Its native range is Venezuela to Northern Brazil.

References

Gentianaceae
Gentianaceae genera
Monotypic Gentianales genera